The Babylonian astronomical diaries are a collection of Babylonian cuneiform texts that contain systematic records of astronomical observations and political events as well as predictions, based on astronomical observations. They also include other information such as commodity prices for particular dates and weather reports.

Currently, they are stored in the British Museum.

It is suggested that the diaries were used as sources for the Babylonian Chronicles.

History
The Babylonians were the first to recognise that astronomical phenomena are periodic and to apply mathematics to their predictions. The oldest known significant astronomical text is Tablet 63 of the Enûma Anu Enlil collection, the Venus tablet of Ammisaduqa, which lists the first and the last visible risings of Venus over a period of about 21 years. It is the earliest evidence that planetary phenomena were recognised as periodic.

The systematic records of ominous phenomena in astronomical diaries began  during the reign of Nabonassar (747–734 BC), when a significant increase in the quality and frequency of astronomical observations occurred. That allowed, for example, the discovery of a repeating 18-year Saros cycle of lunar eclipses.

Translation
Translations of the Diaries are published in multivolume Astronomical Diaries and Related Texts from Babylonia, edited by Abraham Sachs and Hermann Hunger.

 Volume 1 – Diaries from 652 B.C. to 262 B.C. (1988).
 Volume 2 – Diaries from 261 B.C. to 165 B.C. (1989).
 Volume 3 – Diaries from 164 B.C. to 61 B.C. (1996).
 Volume 4 – not yet published.
 Volume 5 – Lunar and Planetary Texts (2001), contains lunar and planetary data from the 8th century BC to the 1st century BC.
 Volume 6 – Goal Year Texts (2006), contains lunar and planetary data, from the 3rd century BC to the 1st century BC.
 Volume 7 – Almanacs and Normal Star Almanacs (2014), contains astronomical almanacs, from the 3rd century BC to the 1st century AD.

References

External links
Astronomical Diaries: article at livius.org 
 Links to translations of Astronomical Diaries: for 333-63 B.C.

Babylonian astronomy
Mesopotamian chronicles
Clay tablets